Erik Christian Gogstad (born 7 May 1963) is a Norwegian bobsledder. He was born in Sandefjord, and represented the club Viking Bobklubb. He competed at the 1992 Winter Olympics in Albertville, in men's two together with Atle Norstad.

References

External links

1963 births
Living people
People from Sandefjord
Norwegian male bobsledders
Olympic bobsledders of Norway
Bobsledders at the 1992 Winter Olympics
Sportspeople from Vestfold og Telemark